Patrik Polívka (born March 4, 1994) is a Czech professional ice hockey goalie. He is currently playing for HC Plzeň of the Czech Extraliga.

Polívka made his Czech Extraliga debut playing with HC Plzeň during the 2014-15 Czech Extraliga season where he stopped 21 of the 25 shots he faced.

References

External links

1994 births
Living people
HC Plzeň players
Czech ice hockey goaltenders
Competitors at the 2015 Winter Universiade
Sportspeople from Plzeň
Czech expatriate ice hockey players in the United States
Czech expatriate ice hockey players in Canada